Trent Lowe (born 8 October 1984, in Melbourne) is a professional road bicycle racer from Australia. Lowe was one of only two Australians on the Slipstream Squad, the other being Chris 'CJ' Sutton who came from Cofidis in 2007. The former full-time professional mountain biker had a breakthrough year on the road in 2005 riding for the US domestic team, Jittery Joe's, where he caught eye of Discovery Channel sports manager Johan Bruyneel. He was signed for Discovery Channel for his superior climbing abilities. In 2002 he won the UCI MTB World Junior XC Championship, then he won the under-23 Australian National Mountain Bike Championship in 2003 and 2004.

Following two seasons of injury and chronic fatigue, the young climber signed with the new Australian team, Pegasus, before the announcement that they had failed to obtain a 2011 UCI World Tour license.

Major results

2000
 1st  U-17 XC National Mountain Bike Champion
2001
 1st  U-19 XC National Mountain Bike Champion
2002
 1st  Junior World Mountain Bike XC Champion
 1st  U-19 XC National Mountain Bike Champion
2003
 1st  U-23 XC  National Mountain Bike Champion
2004
 1st  U-23 XC  National Mountain Bike Champion
2005
 1st Stage 3 Sea Otter Classic
 2nd Overall Redlands Bicycle Classic
1st Stage 1
 11th Overall Tour de Georgia
1st  Young Rider Competition
2006
 6th Overall Herald Sun Tour
1st  U-23 Rider Competition
 15th Overall Volta ao Algarve
2007
 2nd Stage 2 Deutschland Tour
 3rd Overall Herald Sun Tour
1st  U-23 Rider Competition
2008
 2nd Overall, Tour de Georgia
1st Stage 4 TTT
1st  Young Rider Competition
 13th Overall Critérium International
 20th Overall Paris–Nice
10th Prologue

References

External links
 Cycling Australia profile
 VELOBIOS profile

1984 births
Living people
Australian male cyclists
Cross-country mountain bikers
Cyclists from Melbourne
Sportsmen from Victoria (Australia)